Vibrator may refer to:

Technology 

 Vibrator (sex toy), a device for massage or sexual pleasure used by both men and women
 Vibrator (mechanical), a class of devices which create mechanical vibrations for uses such as signaling annunciators, doorbells, or industrial uses such as compacting gravel, transporting materials, cleaning, etc.
 Vibrator (electronic), an electronic component in DC power supplies for generating high voltage made obsolete by the late 1960s
 Vibrating alert, used in mobile phones and pagers

Music 

 Vibrator (music), a musical instrument
 The Vibrators, a British punk band
 Vibrator (album), a 1995 album by Terence Trent D'Arby
 "Vibrator", a song by Motörhead on Motörhead (album)
 "Vibrator", a song by Electric Six, on their second album Senor Smoke

Other 

 Vibroseis, a mobile energy source used in seismic exploration
 Vibrator (film), a 2003 film